Judah is an unincorporated community in Marshall Township, Lawrence County, Indiana.

Judah was named from the presence of the Judah School, established in 1882.

Geography

References

Unincorporated communities in Lawrence County, Indiana
Unincorporated communities in Indiana